The Fourth Fox Ministry was a responsible government which held power in New Zealand from March to April 1873.

Background
After the resignation of George Waterhouse as Premier, Governor Bowen asked three-time ex-Premier William Fox to take office as an interim measure. Fox was to hold office only until Julius Vogel returned from a postal conference in Australia. He was described as "fairy godmother and peacemaker" to the Continuous Ministry. Vogel returned to New Zealand at the start of April and asked Fox to stay on to the beginning of the next session of Parliament, but he refused and passed the office on to Vogel.

Ministers
The following members served in the Fox Ministry:

See also
 New Zealand Government

Notes

References

Ministries of Queen Victoria
Governments of New Zealand
1873 establishments in New Zealand
Cabinets established in 1873
Cabinets disestablished in 1873